
Year 400 (CD) was a leap year starting on Sunday (link will display the full calendar) of the Julian calendar. In the Roman Empire, it was known as the Year of the Consulship of Stilicho and Aurelianus (or, less frequently, year 1153 Ab urbe condita). The denomination 400 for this year has been used since the early medieval period, when the Anno Domini calendar era became the prevalent method in Europe for naming years.

Events 
 By place 

 Roman Empire 

 January 9 – Emperor Arcadius gives his wife Aelia Eudoxia the official title of Augusta. She is able to wear the purple paludamentum and is depicted in Roman currency.
 Anthemius, praetorian prefect of the East, is sent on an embassy to the Persian capital, Ctesiphon, to congratulate King Yazdegerd I on his accession the year before.
 A riot breaks out in Constantinople; the Great Palace is burned to the ground. Gainas, a Gothic leader, attempts to evacuate his soldiers out of the city, but 7,000 armed Goths are trapped and killed by order of Arcadius. After the massacre, Gainas tries to escape across the Hellespont, but his rag-tag ad hoc fleet is destroyed by Fravitta, a Gothic chieftain in imperial service.
 Winter – Gainas leads the remaining Goths back to their homeland across the Danube. They meet the Huns and are defeated; the Hunnic chieftain Uldin sends the head of Gainas to Constantinople, where Arcadius receives it as a diplomatic gift.

 Europe 

 The Paeonians (Illyricum) lose their identity (approximate date).

 Asia 
 Richū, the eldest son of Nintoku, becomes the 17th Emperor of Japan.

 By topic 

 Art 
 Resurrection and "Two Marys with Angel near the Empty Tomb", panel of a diptych, found in Rome, is made. It is now kept at Castello Sforzesco, Milan (approximate date).

 Literature 
 The Vergilius Vaticanus, an illuminated manuscript containing fragments of Virgil's Aeneid and Georgics, is made in Rome.
 The Yoga Sutras of Patanjali are composed.

 Medicine 
 Caelius Aurelianus, Roman physician, is practising his work "De morbis acutis et chronicis" (Concerning Acute and Chronic Illness), a guide to acute and chronic diseases.

 Physics 
 Hypatia, Greek philosopher, distinguishes herself as one of the first women scientists, and becoming head of the Neo-Platonist school at Alexandria.

 Religion 
 The mausoleum of Galerius in Salonica (Greece) is converted into a church.
 Bishops from Gaza (Palestine) arrive at Constantinople to ask Arcadius that he close the pagan temple of Marnas.

Births 
 Aspar, Alan patrician and general (magister militum) (approximate date)
 Hydatius, bishop of Aquae Flaviae (modern Chaves, Portugal) (approximate date)
 Salvian, Christian writer (approximate date)
 Sozomen, Christian Church historian

Deaths 
 Castor of Karden, Christian priest and hermit
 Duan, Chinese empress and wife of Murong Bao
 Gainas, Gothic chieftain and general (magister militum)
 Li Lingrong, empress and mother of Jin Xiaowudi
 Lü Guang, emperor of the Di state Later Liang (b. 337)
 Lü Shao, "Heavenly Prince" (Tian Wang) of Later Liang
 Oribasius, Greek medical writer and physician

References